Siege of Pondicherry (or Pondichéry) may refer to one of the following:
 1693 siege during the Nine Years' War
 1748 siege during the First Carnatic War (part of the War of the Austrian Succession)
 1760-1761 siege during the Third Carnatic War (part of the Seven Years' War)
 1778 siege during the Anglo-French War of 1778-1783
 1793 siege during the French Revolutionary War

See also
Battle of Pondicherry, a 1759 naval engagement during the Third Carnatic War